The Sand Pebbles is a 1962 novel about an American gunboat and its crew on the Yangtze River in the 1920s.

The Sand Pebbles or similar terms may also refer to:

 The Sand Pebbles (film), a 1966 film of the book, with Steve McQueen
 Sand Pebbles, an Australian psychedelic rock band (mainly 2001–2012)
 The Sandpebbles, an American R&B group with one hit "Love Power" (1967)